Wondelgem used to be a village in East Flanders, Belgium. It is now part of the city of Ghent.

History
In the 9th century the Carolingian emperors owned a large estate in Wondelgem. Ghent has a total population of about 230,000, of which about 12,407 people live in Wondelgem.

Famous births
May Sarton, Belgian-American writer.

External links

Sub-municipalities of Ghent
Populated places in East Flanders